The Rich Street Bridge is a bridge in Columbus, Ohio, United States, spanning the Scioto River and connecting downtown's Rich Street to Franklinton's Town Street. It carries U.S. Route 62 (US 62) and Ohio State Route 3 (SR 3). The bridge was completed in 2012.

The bridge replaced the Town Street Bridge (1917-2009). The original eastern anchor remains, reutilized as the Prow, an observation platform in the Scioto Mile Promenade park. The site features stone benches, lanterns, and a grove of birch trees.  The 1917 bridge was part of the Scioto River Bridge Group, listed on the Columbus Register of Historic Properties in 1983 and proposed as part of the Columbus Civic Center Historic District, nominated to the National Register of Historic Places in 1988.

Gallery

See also
 Scioto Lounge

References

External links
 

2012 establishments in Ohio
Bridges completed in 2012
Bridges in Columbus, Ohio
U.S. Route 62
Bridges of the United States Numbered Highway System
Bridges over the Scioto River